Larry Emdur (born 9 December 1964) is an Australian television personality.

Emdur is currently co-host of The Morning Show alongside Kylie Gillies, and host of The Chase Australia. The duo also hosted the Australian version of Celebrity Splash!. He formerly hosted the Australian version of game show The Price Is Right from 1993 to 1998 and later 2003 to 2005 on the Nine Network and then again when the show returned to the Seven Network on 7 May 2012. The show was cancelled later that year.

Emdur is known to Australian audiences for his hosting duties on several other game shows, including Cash Bonanza (Nine Network), and Wheel of Fortune (Seven Network). Emdur hosted Hey Hey it's Saturday five times, once in 1994, twice in 1998, and twice, consecutively, in 1999, and substituted as host of It Takes Two once in 2006 and again in 2007. He has also hosted Celebrity Dog School on Network Ten.

Childhood and early career
Growing up near the beach in Bondi, New South Wales, Emdur developed a keen interest in surfing from an early age. Dropping out of school at age 15, Emdur began his career as a copy boy at The Sydney Morning Herald, before moving into television, where at age 19 he became Australia's youngest national newsreader, presenting the overnight news for Seven Network in Australia. After some time in news and current affairs as a reporter and newsreader, and presenter on Good Morning Australia, Emdur switched to hosting game shows and variety television.

TV career
Emdur is known as the host of The Price Is Right on the Nine Network, which he hosted from 1993 to 1998, before its cancellation. It was then revived on 23 June 2003 and ran until 24 November 2005, when it was cancelled due to poor ratings and high costs of production. To commemorate the United States version's 40th season in 2011–12, on a July 2011 trip to the United States, Emdur called down a contestant and served as a guest host for Cliff Hangers, under recommendation of host Drew Carey. Emdur also modelled a trip to Australia in one of the two showcases that are presented on the United States version. Emdur was one of numerous hosts who have hosted the format to appear as part of the 40th anniversary celebration.

Emdur filled in for Daryl Somers on the family show Hey Hey It's Saturday. After being "rested" by the Nine Network following the cancellation of The Price Is Right, Emdur became host of the Seven Network's Wheel of Fortune. His contract with Seven was signed hours after his deal with the Nine Network expired. While in the first few weeks of his run with Seven's Wheel in the  weekday timeslot, Emdur continued to appear simultaneously on Nine in re-runs of The Price Is Right, until Bert's Family Feud took over the  timeslot on Nine in mid-February 2006. On 19 June 2006, news emerged of Wheel of Fortune'''s cancellation at the end of the 2006 season. Channel 10's Rove Live then started a campaign to "Save Larry Emdur", although Seven soon put an end to Rove's jokes by issuing a statement that Emdur would be staying with the Seven Network.

Emdur has also been a fill-in host for It Takes Two and has filled in for Andrew O'Keefe on Weekend Sunrise and David Koch on Sunrise.

Emdur signed up with Network Ten in 2007. He had joined up to host a new show Celebrity Dog School, which began airing in February.

Emdur is currently co-hosting The Morning Show with Kylie Gillies, a morning talk show airing on the Seven Network. The show began in mid-2007.

Emdur was invited to participate in the 2009 Sydney to Hobart Yacht Race by finance commentator Anthony Bell. Upon reaching Hobart, Emdur said on The Morning Show that he may never set foot on a boat again. However, in 2010 Emdur signed on to participate in the Sydney to Hobart again. His crew on the yacht Investec LOYAL finished second. On 4 February 2011, Emdur renewed his contract with the Seven Network, reportedly worth in excess of $800,000 a year. This contract stopped him from defecting to the Nine Network to co-host Today. The contract allows him to stay on as co-host of The Morning Show and "other opportunities".

In February 2010, Seven announced that Emdur would co-host Weekend Sunrise on Saturday mornings alongside Samantha Armytage, and he held this position until the end of 2010. Emdur is also currently a regular fill in co-host for Koch on Sunrise and Matt Doran on Weekend Sunrise if they are away on holidays, sick or on assignment.

In September 2013, Emdur produced and hosted a pilot for a late night talk show titled Larry on Late in Sydney, which featured guests Guy Sebastian, Samantha Armytage and Manon Youdale. Seven Network passed on the show after viewing the pilot.

In December 2013, Emdur was a crew member aboard racing supermaxi yacht Perpetual Loyal in the 2013 Sydney to Hobart Yacht Race, with his other celebrity crew members, Karl Stefanovic, Guillaume Brahimi, Tom Slingsby, Phil Waugh and Jude Bolton.

In 2014, Emdur and co-host of The Morning Show, Kylie Gillies, whose studio is across from the Sydney Lindt Cafe, were able to view and report on the events of the Martin Place siege, as it unfolded, before transmission handed over to the Seven Network Melbourne studios.

Emdur appeared in the fifteenth season of Dancing with the Stars.

In 2021, Seven Network announced that Emdur would be the new host of The Chase Australia, replacing Andrew O'Keefe after O'Keefe's contract was not renewed by Seven Network at the end of 2020 prior to being charged with assault in January 2021. However, according to reports, he was close to not renewing his contract with the Seven Network at the end of last year and was offered The Chase'' hosting role in a bid to keep him at the network. The episodes with Emdur as a host began airing on 26 July 2021 after the final episode of Andrew O'Keefe aired on 20 July 2021.

Personal life 
Emdur married his wife Sylvie in 1995. They have two children.

References

External links
 

1964 births
Australian game show hosts
Television personalities from Melbourne
The Price Is Right
People from Sydney
Living people